Silver hexafluorophosphate, sometimes referred to "silver PF-6," is an inorganic compound with the chemical formula AgPF6.

Uses and reactions
Silver hexafluorophosphate is a commonly encountered reagent in inorganic and organometallic chemistry.  It is commonly used to replace halide ligands with the weakly coordinating hexafluorophosphate anion; the abstraction of the halide is driven by the precipitation of the appropriate silver halide.  Illustrative is the preparation of acetonitrile complexes from a metal bromide, a reaction that would typically be conducted in a solution of acetonitrile:  
AgPF6 + Re(CO)5Br + CH3CN → AgBr + [Re(CO)5(CH3CN)]PF6

AgPF6 can act as an oxidant, forming silver metal as a by-product. For example, in solution in dichloromethane, ferrocene is oxidised to ferrocenium hexafluorophosphate:

AgPF6 + Fe(C5H5)2 → Ag + [Fe(C5H5)2]PF6 (E = 0.65 V)

Related reagents
In terms of their properties and applications, silver tetrafluoroborate (AgBF4) and the hexafluoroantimonate (AgSbF6) are similar to AgPF6.

Comparison with silver nitrate
Silver nitrate is a traditional and less expensive halide abstraction reagent, as indicated by its widespread use in qualitative tests for halides. Relative to AgPF6, however, silver nitrate is poorly soluble in weakly basic solvents: the nitrate anion is Lewis basic and presents an interfering ligand that precludes its use in stringent applications.

References

Silver compounds
Hexafluorophosphates